The following is a list of mayors of Edmond, Oklahoma.

References

Edmond
People from Edmond, Oklahoma